Otello is a 1906 Italian silent film based on the 1887 opera of the same name by Giuseppe Verdi, both being based on the William Shakespeare play Othello. The film was directed by and starred Mario Caserini, playing opposite his wife Maria Caserini. It is believed to be the earliest film adaptation of the play, released in Italy on 30 October 1906.

References

1906 films
1900s historical drama films
Italian historical drama films
Italian silent short films
Films based on Othello
Films based on operas
Films set in the 16th century
Films set in Venice
Films set in Cyprus
Italian black-and-white films
Films based on adaptations
Films directed by Gaston Velle
Films directed by Mario Caserini
Silent drama films